Ma'ale Shlomo is an Israeli outpost in the West Bank. Located to the south of Kokhav HaShahar, it falls under the jurisdiction of the Mateh Binyamin Regional Council.

It was named after Shlomo Alba, an agronomist from Kokhav HaShahar. It was established in 1999 and is situated 1.1 km outside the boundaries of the parent settlement  (Kochav HaShahar). It has contains 18 structures, with 19 caravans. 15 families live there.

The international community considers Israeli settlements in the West Bank illegal under international law, but the Israeli government disputes this. It is under the jurisdiction of the Binyamin Regional Council.

References

Israeli settlements in the West Bank
Mateh Binyamin Regional Council
Populated places established in 1999
1999 establishments in the Palestinian territories
Israeli outposts
Unauthorized Israeli settlements